Filip Firbacher (born 21 December 2001) is a Czech football player who plays as forward for Hradec Králové in Czech National Football League.

In 2018, The Guardian named Firbacher in a list of the 60 top football talents born in the year 2001. At the time, Firbacher was playing for FC Hradec Králové's under-19 team.

References

External links
Hradec Králové profile
National team profile

2001 births
Living people
Czech footballers
Czech National Football League players
FC Hradec Králové players
Association football forwards
Czech Republic youth international footballers